Sumathendra Raghavendra Nadig (4 May 1935 - 7 August 2018) was an Indian professor and writer in Kannada. Nadig came upon the literary scene as a prominent modern poet in the 1960s. He was a close associate of Gopalakrishna Adiga, the leader of the modernist movement.

Nadig's "Dampatya Gita" has been translated into English, Hindi, Bengali and other Indian languages. His other major poem, "Panchabhut", is considered to be an important and original contribution to modern Indian literature. His poetic achievement has been acknowledged by poets including Gopalakrishna Adiga, Pu. Ti. Narasimhachar, Ayyappa Panikar, Sitanshu Yashaschandra, Manohar Rai Sardesai, and G. S. Shivrudrappa; writers including S. L. Bhyrappa and U. R. Anantha
Murthy; and scholars including Kapila Vatsyayan and Sibnarayan Ray.

Nadig had two master's degrees in English, one from Mysore University and the other from Temple University (US). He also received a PhD in Kannada from Bangalore University and an honorary doctorate, "Shabda Marthand", from Gurukul Kangri University, Hardwar.

He had received many awards, including the Karnataka Rajyothsava Prashsti, Dinakara Pratisthana Prashasti, V. M. Inamdar
Prashsti, and M.V.Si. Puraskara.

He was the Chairman of National Book Trust from 1996 to 1999.

He was well known for his critical studies of Bendre, K.S. Narasimha Swamy and Adiga, and short stories and nursery rhymes, and translations from Bengali to Kannada, and from Kannada to English. He knew Kannada, English, Hindi, Marathi, Konkani, and Bengali.

Personal life
Sumatheendra Nadig was married to Malathi and had three children.

Awards

 Bala Sahitya Puraskara by Sahitya Akademi in 2016
 Kempe Gowda Award, Bruhat Bengaluru Mahanagara Palike, July 2007
 Sri Krishna Prashasti, conferred by Sri Sri Pejawara
 Viswesha Tirtha Swamiji, June 2007
 Vijayeendra Puraskara, conferred by Sri Sri
 Sushameendra Teertha Swamiji, July 2007
 Niranjana Prashasti, 2006
 Aryabhata Award, 2005
 Visweswariah Sahitya Prashasti, 2005
 M.Vi.See, Sahitya Puraskar, 2004
 Sahitya Siri Award, Chickmagalur Jilla Sahitya Parishat, 2002
 UGC Emeritus Fellow, March 2000 – 2002
 Chairman, National Book Trust, India, October 1996 – October 1999
 Award for Translation–Karnataka Sahitya Akademi, 1999
 Awarded 'Vidya Marthanda' honorary degree: Gurukul
 Kangri University, 1997, Haridwar, delivered the convocation address
 V.M. Inamdar Vimarsha Prashasti, 1995
 Rajyotsava Award – Govt. of Karnataka, 1995
 Award for translation – Karnataka Sahitya Akademi, 1994
 Sahitya Akademi Travel Grant, 1991
 Dinakar Pratishthana Award, 1990
 U.G.C. Short Term Research Grant, 1998
 Award for Translation–Karnataka Sahitya Akademi, 1997
 Best Fiction Award – ‘Sudha’ Novel Competition, 1997

Academic  and professional experience 

 Visiting Professor, Viswa-Bharati, Shantiniketan, October–December 1997
 Visiting Fellow, Jadhavpur University, Calcutta, November 1991 – March 1992
 Reader in English, Bangalore University, 1989–95
 Senior Executive, Bappco Publication, Bangalore 1975–80
 Part-time faculty of the Department of English, Temple University, Philadelphia, 1972–74
 Instructor in English, Haverford College, Haverford, 1973
 Professor and Head of the Department of English, St. Xavier's College, Mapusa, Goa, 1965–197
 Visiting Professor, Bombay University Post-Graduate Centre, Panjim, Goa, 1965–1971.
 Lecturer in English at Margo, Bombay and Belgaum, 1957–65.

Literary works

Books published in Kannada

Poetry  
 Jada Mattu Chetana, 2005
  Pancha Bhootagalu, 2000
  Samagra Kavya, 1998
  Nataraja Kanda Kamanabillu, 1994
  Kuhoo Gita, 1992.
  Tamashe Padyagalu, 1992, 1998
  Dampatya Gita, 1987 (translated into Sanskrit, English, Bengali, Urdu, Tamil, Telugu, Assamese, Malayalam, Punjabi, and Marathi)
  Bhava Loka, 1983
  Udghatane, 1978
  Kappu Devate, 1970
  Nimma Premakumariya Jataka, 1964

Criticism

  Mounadaacheya Maatu, 2007
  Nalkaneya Sahitya Charitre, 2005
  Mattondu Sahitya Charitre, 2002, 2004
  Bendreyavara Kavyada Vibhinna Nelegalu, 1989, 1998
  Adigaru Mattu Navyakavya, 1968, 75, 98, 2006 (reserved)
  Innondu Sahitya Charitre, 1999
  Heegondu Sahitya Charitre, 1995
  Vimarsheya Dariyalli, 1994
  Kavya Endarenu, 1994

Children's books

 Dakkanakka Dakkana, 2005
 Dhruva Mattu Prahlada, 2003
 Didilak Didilak, 2002
 Goobeya Kathe, 2000, 2003
 Ili Maduve, 1999
 Galipata, 1999, 2004
 Sahasa (a novel), serialised in 1978, in book form 1979, 1998
 Hannondu Hamsagalu (a play), 1987

Short stories

  Sthithaprajna, 1996
 Aayda Kathegalu, 1992 (textbook for B.A., BSc and B.Com. students of Bangalore University 1992–1993)
 Gili Mattu Dumbi, 1985
 Karkotaka, 1975, 1998

Some of his stories have been translated into Bengali, Malayalam, Tamil, Telugu, Marathi, Hindi, Urdu, Oriya and English.

Translations

From English to Kannada:

 Radhanath Ray, 1991 – Sahitya Akademi
 Sindhi Sahitya Charitre, 1981 – Sahitya Akademi
 Dickens 'Hard Times', 1981 (with Venugopala Soraba)
 Aristophane's 'Birds', 1990
 Ruskin's 'Unto The Last', 1979
 Strindberg's 'Miss Julie', 1979
 Ionesco's 'Bokka Taleya Nartaki', 1974

From Bengali to Kannada:

 Tagore's 'Tin Sangi', 1998
 Nirendranath Chakravarthi's 'Ulang Raja', 1996
 Poems from Bengal, 2002

Books published in English
 Selected poems of Gopalaksirhna Adiga; Sahitya Akademi, 2005
 Veerappa Moily's novel 'On to the Great Beyond', 2003
 The Buddha Smile with P. Sreenivas Rao
 A House of Thousand Doors
 Poems of G. S. Shivarudrappa
 20th Century Kannada Poetry with an introduction by Nissim Ezekiel
 Selected Kannada Short Stories and Jnanapeeth Laureatres of Karnataka (with L. S. Seshagiri Rao)
 Roots and Wings (Poems of P. Sreenivasa Rao), 2007
 Complete works of P. Sreenivasa Rao, 2002
 Critical Studies of S. L. Bhyrappa's Works, 2002

See also
 Kannada
 Kannada literature

References

External links
 Sumatheendra Nadig works on Bendre
 Sumathendra Nadig's article on Gopalakrishna Adiga

1935 births
Living people
Kannada-language writers
Indian socialists
Bangalore University alumni
People from Chikkamagaluru district
University of Mysore alumni
Writers from Bangalore
20th-century Indian poets
20th-century Indian short story writers
20th-century Indian translators
20th-century Indian novelists
Novelists from Karnataka
Poets from Karnataka
20th-century Indian male writers